Single Wives is a 1924 American silent drama film directed by George Archainbaud and produced by and starring Corinne Griffith. It was distributed by First National Pictures.

Cast

Preservation status
Single Wives is preserved at the George Eastman House Motion Picture Collection.

References

External links

Lobby poster and stills at silenthollywood.com
Still at silentfilmstillarchive.com

1924 films
1924 drama films
Silent American drama films
American silent feature films
Films directed by George Archainbaud
American black-and-white films
First National Pictures films
1920s American films